Cockley Cley is a village and civil parish in the English county of Norfolk.

History
The village's name is of Anglo-Saxon origin and derives from the Old English for a clay hill shrouded in trees.

In the Domesday Book, Cockley Cley is recorded as a settlement of 32 households located in the hundred of South Greenhoe. In 1086, the village was divided between the estates of King William I and William de Warenne.

Cockley Cley is the site of significant defensive infrastructure built during the Second World War, including a rare example of an 'Allan Williams Turret' designed to mount a Lewis gun in an anti-aircraft role.

In 1974, an unidentified decapitated corpse was discovered near the village. As of 2022, the individual remains unidentified.

Between 1975 and 2004, Cockley Cley was home to a mock Iceni village visitor attraction. The site reopened briefly in 2014 as the 'Iceni Centre' but was subsequently forced to close due to dwindling customer numbers.

Geography
In the 2011 census, Cockley Cley was recorded as having 232 residents living in 117 households.

Cley falls within the constituency of Mid Norfolk and is represented at Parliament by George Freeman MP of the Conservative Party.

All Saints' Church
Cockley Cley's parish church is one of Norfolk's 124 existing Anglo-Saxon round-tower churches. The church was significantly remodelled in the nineteenth century by the architect Richard Phipson. The church tower collapsed on 29 August 1991 and remains unbuilt.

War memorial
Cockley Cley's war memorial is a marble plaque located inside All Saints' Church which lists the following names for the First World War:
 Corporal William B. Root (1893–1916), 8th Battalion, Royal Norfolk Regiment
 Corporal Frederick Atter (1896–1917), 9th Battalion, Royal Norfolk Regiment
 Lance-Corporal Wallace G. Rungary (d.1918), 1st Battalion, Royal Norfolk Regiment
 Fireman Frederick W. Barker (1887–1915), S.S. Sailor Prince
 Private Henry Norman (1885–1916), 14th Battalion, Gloucestershire Regiment
 Private Charles R. Wilding (1883–1915), 8th Battalion, Royal Norfolk Regiment
 F. Draper
 E. Pedgrift

And, the following for the Second World War:
 Marine Sydney A. Holman (1924–1944), H.M. Landing Craft (Flack) 14
 Private Russell K. Pigg (1917–1940), 2nd Battalion, Royal Norfolk Regiment

Gallery

References

http://kepn.nottingham.ac.uk/map/place/Norfolk/Cockley%20Clay

External links

All Saints of the European Round Tower Churches Website

Breckland District
Villages in Norfolk
Civil parishes in Norfolk